Isoentomon serinus is a species of proturan in the family Eosentomidae. It is found in Africa and South America.

References

Protura
Articles created by Qbugbot
Animals described in 2004